

Medalists

Qualification

Qualification rule: qualification standard 7.95m or at least best 8 qualified

Final

Long jump at the World Athletics Indoor Championships
Long Jump Men